

Incumbents 

 President: Gitanas Nausėda
 Prime Minister: Ingrida Šimonytė

Events 

 January 19 – Defence Minister Arvydas Anušauskas warns that the presence of Russian troops in Belarus poses a "direct threat" to the country.

 March 2 – Lithuania voted on a United Nations resolution condemning Russia for its invasion of Ukraine.

References 

 
2020s in Lithuania
Years of the 21st century in Lithuania
Lithuania
Lithuania